Irene Mary 'Rene' Lentle (née Cox) (1912–2003) was a female English international table tennis player.

Table tennis career
She won a bronze medal at the 1948 World Table Tennis Championships in the women's doubles with Audrey Fowler.

Personal life
She married in 1938.

See also
 List of table tennis players
 List of World Table Tennis Championships medalists

References

English female table tennis players
1912 births
2003 deaths
World Table Tennis Championships medalists